A crocodile is a large reptile of the family Crocodylidae.

Crocodile(s), The Crocodile(s) or Le Crocodile may also refer to:

Fiction 
 Michael "Crocodile" Dundee, a character in three films, played by Paul Hogan
 Crocodile (1980 film), a Thai film directed by Sompote Sands
 Crocodile (1996 film), a Korean film directed by Kim Ki-duk
 Crocodile (2000 film), a horror film directed by Tobe Hooper
 The Crocodile (film), a 2005 Cambodian film
 Le Crocodile (cancelled film), a cancelled French film
 "Crocodile" (Dexter), an episode of the American television series Dexter
 "The Crocodile" (Once Upon a Time), an episode of the American television series Once Upon a Time
 "Crocodile" (Black Mirror), an episode of anthology series Black Mirror
 "The Crocodile" (short story), an 1865 story by Fyodor Dostoyevsky
 Crocodile (One Piece), a character in the One Piece manga and anime series
 Mr. Gold, a character from the American television series Once Upon a Time nicknamed the Crocodile

Music
 Crocodiles (band), an American lo-fi new wave band
 The Crocodiles, a New Zealand pop band
 Crocodiles (album), a 1980 album by Echo & The Bunnymen
 "Crocodile" (song), a song by Underworld
 "Crocodile", a song by The Coasters
 "Crocodile", a song by XTC from Nonsuch
 The Crocodile, a music venue in Seattle, Washington, U.S.
 Le Crocodile, an 1886 opera by Jules Massenet and Victorien Sardou

In the military 
 HMS Crocodile, four ships of the Royal Navy
 Churchill Crocodile, a British Second World War flamethrowing tank
 a nickname for the Mil Mi-24, a Soviet attack helicopter
 Crocodile Armoured Personnel Carrier, a Rhodesian/Zimbabwean troop-carrying vehicle

Transport 
 Crocodile (locomotive), a type of electric locomotive
 Crocodile (train protection system), or Le Crocodile, used in France, Belgium and Luxembourg
 A "Crocodile" is an organized group of walking people, usually schoolchildren, sometimes called a walking bus

Places 
 Crocodile River (disambiguation)
 Lake Timsah, also known as Crocodile Lake, in the Nile delta of Egypt
 Central Island, also known as Crocodile Island, Lake Turkana, Kenya
 Crocodile Islands, Northern Territory, Australia
 Crocodile Creek, near Bouldercombe, Queensland, Australia

Sports 
 Cologne Crocodiles, an American football club from Cologne, Germany
 Coritiba Crocodiles, a professional Brazilian American football team headquartered in Curitiba, Paraná
 Seinajoki Crocodiles, an American football team from Seinäjoki, Finland
 Townsville Crocodiles, an Australian National Football League team based in Townsville, Queensland
 Crocodile Trophy, an annual mountain bike race staged in Queensland, Australia

People with the nickname 
 Crocodile (pharaoh), ancient Egyptian protodynastic ruler
 René Lacoste (1904–1996), French tennis player
 Emmerson Mnangagwa, Zimbabwean politician
 Ernest Rutherford (1871–1937), New Zealand–born British chemist and physicist
 P. W. Botha (1916-2006), Afrikaans: Die Groot Krokodil (The Big Crocodile), South African politician

Other uses 
 Crocodile (Carrington), a painting and a sculpture by Leonora Carrington
 Crocodile clip, an electrical connector
 Crocodile Garments, a textile and garment company

See also
 
 Au Crocodile, a French restaurant in Strasburg
 Mohammad-Taqi Mesbah-Yazdi (born 1934), Iranian cleric nicknamed "Professor Crocodile"
 Crocodilefish (disambiguation)
 Croco (disambiguation)
 Krokodil (disambiguation)
 Croc (disambiguation)